John Michael Davison (born 9 May 1970) is a former Canadian professional cricketer who captained the national side in One Day Internationals. He was a hard-hitting right-handed batsman in the top or middle order, who bowled right-arm off break.

Davison retired in March 2011, playing his last game against Australia at the 2011 World Cup.

Early life
He was born in Campbell River, British Columbia to Australian teachers on a one-year teaching exchange, Davison moved to Australia and attended school at St Ignatius' College, Riverview where he was a member of the 1st XI before playing grade cricket in Sydney for Gordon and Mosman and Melbourne and attending the Australian Cricket Academy in 1993.  He was a member of the Victoria state squad for a number of years but was unable to hold down a regular place in the side.

International career
In 1999, Davison agreed to spend the Australian winters in Canada as a club player and coach. He quickly became involved with the Canadian national team, representing them in the 2001 ICC Trophy where Canada performed well to qualify for the 2003 Cricket World Cup in South Africa and Zimbabwe.

At the World Cup, Davison made an overnight name for himself, stunning the strong West Indies team with an aggressive innings of 111 (reaching 100 from 67 balls, then the quickest century in World Cup history at that time, and the first One Day International century for Canada), before making a half-century against New Zealand at the incredible strike rate of 200.

Continuing his form for Canada, Davison returned to the national line-up for the 2004 ICC Intercontinental Cup, and was named as captain. He was in inspirational form as Canada overcame rivals USA, top-scoring with 84 in Canada's first innings and taking match figures of 17 for 137 (8 for 61 and 9 for 76), the best first-class match figures anywhere in the world since Jim Laker's 19 for 90 during the 1956 Ashes.

Davison has continued to represent Canada internationally as captain of the team, and against Bermuda in 2006 he scored his only first-class century, 165 from 175 balls.

Retained as captain of Canada for the 2007 Cricket World Cup, Davison reached 50 against New Zealand from only 23 balls.

Domestic career
After his successes for the modest Canadian team at the 2003 World Cup, Davison returned to Australia and continued playing for South Australia, where he had played since 2002 after being released by Victoria.

His form at international level did not help in Australia though as in January 2005, Davison was dropped from the South Australia state squad. He continued to play cricket in Australia at a lower level during the Australian summer. In the 2006–07 season, he played for Mosman in Sydney Grade Cricket and has recently been appointed as a development coach with the Australian Cricket Academy.

World Cup highlights
 On 23 February 2003, against the West Indies, Davison scored 111 runs off 76 balls, the first 100 of which were scored off 67 balls – the fastest century in World Cup history at the time, and the fastest century by an associate player in ODI history. In his innings, he hit 6 sixes and 8 fours before eventually falling to a spectacular backwards-leaping catch at the boundary by Vasbert Drakes having attempted to score yet another six. The second-highest score for his team was just 19.  He had been dropped on 50 and on 78, and more unusually, escaped when he played a ball onto the stumps without disturbing the bails.  Despite his performance, Canada were convincingly beaten by the West Indies, who reached their target of 203 in just over 20 overs.
 On 3 March 2003, against New Zealand, Davison scored 75 runs off 62 balls, reaching his 50 from 25 balls. He also opened the bowling with his off-spin, and took three wickets.
 On 23 March 2011, against New Zealand, Davison reached 50 runs in 23 balls which was the third fastest fifty in World Cup history, behind only Brendon McCullum, who did it in 20 balls in the same match, and Mark Boucher, who took 21 balls six days previously. However, New Zealand went on to win the match by 114 runs.

Coaching career 

He was appointed to a new position as Australian spin coach for the 2013–14 Ashes series, particularly mentoring Nathan Lyon.

References

External links
 

1970 births
Cricketers from British Columbia
Canadian cricket captains
Canadian cricketers
Canada One Day International cricketers
Canada Twenty20 International cricketers
Cricketers at the 2003 Cricket World Cup
Cricketers at the 2007 Cricket World Cup
Cricketers at the 2011 Cricket World Cup
Living people
People from Campbell River, British Columbia
South Australia cricketers
Victoria cricketers
Canadian people of Australian descent
Australian cricket coaches
Canadian cricket coaches